

Software
 Plug-in (computing), a piece of software which enhances another software application and usually cannot be run independently.
 Browser extension, which modifies the interface and/or behavior of web browsers
 Add-on (Mozilla), a piece of software that enhances and customizes Mozilla-based applications
 Expansion pack, an add-on for a video game

Hardware
 Peripheral, an optional computer hardware component that supplements or enhances the functionality of the original unit
 Video game accessory, a piece of hardware used in conjunction with a video game console for playing video games

Other
 An extension to a house
 Addon, a person named in the Hebrew bible
 An adjuvant therapy, an add-on therapy to existing treatment

See also
 Plug-in (disambiguation)